FRYfest, “a Celebration of all that is Hawkeye,” is held annually in the Iowa City and Coralville area the Friday prior to the Iowa Hawkeye Football season. 

FRYfest was created in 2009 as a collaborative effort between the Iowa City/Coralville Area Convention & Visitors Bureau, City of Coralville, and University of Iowa Athletics, to kick off the football season, draw visitors’ attention to the community, and improve the quality of life for residents of the Iowa City/Coralville Area. The event is named after one of the greatest Hawkeyes of all time and the man who is responsible for bringing the TigerHawk to the University of Iowa, Hayden Fry.

FRYfest is a one-day ‘Celebration of all that is Hawkeye’ to kick off the Hawkeye athletic seasons the Friday before the first home football game. With 20,000 members of Hawkeye Nation in attendance, it is quickly becoming a tradition for fans to travel to Coralville, Iowa each year to take part in the festivities. The event also serves as a fundraiser for the City of Coralville with proceeds of the concert and beverage garden going towards Coralville's Fourth of July Celebrations.

Its first six years have included the honoring of Hayden Fry, Forest Evashevski, Dan Gable, the Iowa vs. ISU football rivalry, quarterbacks of the Hayden Fry era, “The World’s Largest Hawkeye Tradeshow,” a tailgate and show and shine car show, autograph sessions with coaches and former athletes, a Hawkeye pep rally, outdoor concerts, a fully staged, live production honoring Dan Gable, and the festival's most popular accomplishment, breaking two Guinness World Records - one in 2010 for the Largest Hokey Pokey Dance with 7,384 participants, and the other in 2014 for the Longest Marathon Playing Cornhole (bags) for a continuous 26 hours, 12 minutes, and 44 seconds.

August 31, 2018 marks the 10th Annual FRYfest, presented by MidWestOne Bank.

History
The event is named after Hayden Fry, the man who is responsible for bringing the Tigerhawk to the University of Iowa and who many claim is the greatest Hawkeye of all-time. Each year of the event has brought in thousands of attendees and has included events such as the World's Largest Hawkeye Tradeshow, a car show, autograph sessions with coaches and athletes, a pep rally, and an outdoor concert.  The event is quickly becoming a season-opener tradition for Hawkeye Nation.

Special events

Hayden Fry Way
During the inaugural FRYfest celebration, First Avenue (between I-80 and Hwy 6) in Coralville, Iowa, was co-named and publicly unveiled as Hayden Fry Way. This honor was bestowed to University of Iowa's winningest football coach, Hayden Fry, on the most traveled road in Johnson County and the gateway for Kinnick-bound Iowa fans.

Forest Evashevski Drive
FRYfest 2010 kicked off at historic Kinnick Stadium with a commemorative street renaming ceremony honoring Forest “Evy” Evashevski. Evashevski served as the Hawkeyes' head coach from 1952 to 1960, turning the failing football program around by capturing Big 10 championships in 1956, 1958, and 1960, and leading the Hawkeyes to two Rose Bowl championship titles in 1956 and 1958. Following his success as head coach, Evy acted as Iowa's athletic director from 1960 until 1970.

Hokey Pokey
In its second year, FRYfest broke the Guinness World Record for the Largest Hokey Pokey dance with 7,384 participants on September 3, 2010. Event organizers had asked Hawkeye Nation to “shake it all about” to beat the then existing record of 4,431 in Toronto, Canada. The connection to the Hawkeyes stemmed from the Hayden Fry era when the coach and his teams performed the Hokey Pokey many times during the 1980s and 1990s in the locker room after a big victory.

This is Your Life Dan Gable
In its third year, FRYfest honored wrestler and coach Dan Gable with the festival's own live version of the popular 1950s television program This is Your Life. The fully staged production provided an opportunity to learn more about his life and a chance to thank Gable for all that he has accomplished – so far. There was big-screen documentary video and many guests on hand to help Dan remember his collegiate career and two NCAA championships, his Olympic Gold Medal, and his unprecedented coaching success at Iowa.

Some of the surprise guests included Tom and Terry Brands, Jim Leach, Bump Elliott, and Hayden Fry along with video messages from Frank Gifford and Lute Olson, among others.

Iowa vs. ISU
The fourth FRYfest celebration recognized the 35th anniversary of the renewed rivalry between the Iowa Hawkeyes and Iowa State Cyclones. The two teams faced off in 1977, the year the Cy-Hawk traveling trophy was introduced, for the first time since 1934. The Iowa and Iowa State ROTC programs commemorated the matchup in 2012 by running the game ball from Ames to Iowa City, handing it off at the halfway mark and ending at the FRYfest Pep Rally. Frank Fritz from the History Channel's ‘American Pickers’ was also one of the day's special guests.

Herky on Parade Meets FRYfest
Year five was all about the fans. The event introduced a Hawkeye Fashion Show/Product Showcase to show off all the latest gear offered by vendors, and featured the unveil of three designs to be seen in the upcoming Herky on Parade project, a 10th anniversary public art event to be launched the following May.

FRYfest VI celebrated the quarterbacks of the Hayden Fry era and featured a panel discussion with Chuck Long, Tom Grogan, Ryan Driscoll, and other key quarterbacks, along with Hayden Fry himself. New additions included a Hawkeye Trivia competition and an outdoor Hawkeye bags tournament. The final farewell of Herky on Parade, where all 84 statues were brought together after a summer on the streets, also drew many families to the event.

Longest Marathon Cornhole Game
In 2014, FRYfest became the official Guinness World Records holder of the longest marathon playing cornhole. Four Hawkeye fans played cornhole (also known as bags) for 26 hours, 12 minutes, and 44 seconds straight, giving FRY fest its second Guinness World Record.

Attractions and Entertainment

World’s Largest Licensed Hawkeye Tradeshow and Tailgate Party
A sea of black and gold can be found in what is the World's Largest Hawkeye Tradeshow and Tailgate Party. On hand for Hawkeye enthusiast are hundreds of Hawkeye retailers, current University of Iowa student athletes, coaches and media personalities, and the Hall of Fame Class. The 4th Annual FRYfest featured Hawkeye as well as Cyclone vendors showcasing their latest merchandise.

Car Show
Car enthusiasts of all types are encouraged to flaunt their ride at the FRYfest Show & Shine. Car entries are free and include the chance of taking home one of many awards including, but limited to Hayden Fry's Choice, Mayor's Choice, and Herky's Choice. There is also a tailgate car category.

Autograph Sessions
Throughout the day of the event, scheduled autograph sessions include current University of Iowa athletic teams, and the Hall of Fame Class and reunions particular to that year. 2012 FRYfest welcomed Frank Fritz of American Pickers to open the Tradeshow for an autograph session.

Concerts
FRYfest concludes at the Iowa River Landing with an outdoor concert. Past artists have included Jake Owen, The Outlaws, Joan Jett & The Blackhearts, The Charlie Daniels Band, the Nadas, Three Dog Night, 8 Seconds, Josh Turner, Sara Evans, Lee Brice, Dustin Lynch, Chris Cagle, Craig Campbell, and David Nail.

References

External links
 
 
 
 
 

Festivals in Iowa
Tourist attractions in Johnson County, Iowa